Next Wave is a 2003 house album by Shinichi Osawa, aka Mondo Grosso. It contains collaborations with  Kelis, Armand Van Helden, BoA, UA, Harry Romero and others. 
The track "Blaze it Up" appeared as "BLZ" on the soundtrack to the 2002 FIFA World Cup, Fever Pitch.

Track listing
 "Blaze it Up" - 6:17
 "Motormouth" - 6:25
 "Waitin' For T" - 5:07
 "Intermezzo Cosmo" - 1:01
 "Everything Needs Love" (feat. BoA) - 5:58
 "Intermezzo Earth" - 1:07
 "Fight for Your Right" (feat. Kelis) - 4:55
 "Dancefloor Combat" - 6:40
 "Graceful Ways" - 6:33
 "Next Wave" - 5:33
 "Tornado" - 6:03
 "Intermezzo Sun" - 1:14
 "Shinin'" - 6:36
 "光" (feat. UA) - 7:13

2003 albums
Shinichi Osawa albums
House music albums by Japanese artists